This is a list of Israel's ambassadors to Panama.  The current ambassador is Itai Bardov, who has held the position since 2021.

List of Ambassadors

Itai Bardov 2021 - 
Reda Mansour 2018 - 2021
Gil Artzyeli 2016 - 2018
Alexander Galilee 2011 - 2015
Yoed Magen 2009 - 2011
Menashe Bar-On 2005 - 2009
Emanuel Seri 2001 - 2002
Yair Recanati 1997 - 2001
Yaacov Brakha 1993 - 1997 
Shaul Kariv 1984 - 1988
Chanan Olami 1979 - 1982
Menachem Karmi 1976 - 1979
Mordechay Arbel 1972 - 1976
Yehiel Eilsar 1968 - 1972
Levy Arye Alon1964 - 1968
Joshua Nissim Shai (Non-Resident, Guatemala City) 1959 - 1964

References

Panama
Israel